Nez Perce Peak is located in the Teton Range, Grand Teton National Park, Wyoming, immediately southeast of Grand Teton.  The peak is in the central portions of the range, immediately east of Cloudveil Dome and is sometimes considered to be part of what is collectively known as the Cathedral Group. Nez Perce rises to the south of Garnet Canyon and is a dramatic peak that dominates the skyline to the west of Bradley and Taggart Lakes. When viewed from the western section of Jackson Hole, Nez Perce often obscures the view of Cloudveil Dome as well as South Teton, even though both summits are higher.

References

Mountains of Grand Teton National Park
Mountains of Wyoming
Mountains of Teton County, Wyoming